The College of Business Administration of Savannah State University offers the Bachelor of Business Administration degree with concentrations in Accounting, Computer Information Systems, Global Logistics & International Business, Management, and Marketing. The college also offers an MBA program. The college also offers a teaching certification for business majors in a program with Armstrong State University's College of Teacher Education and partners with Armstrong Atlantic to operate the Coastal Georgia Center for Economic Education, a joint program which conducts workshops for area teachers to help meet student economic standards and teachers from the Economics America Program of the Savannah-Chatham school system.

Accreditation
The College of Business Administration bachelor's degree in business administration and an MBA programs are accredited by The Association to Advance Collegiate Schools of Business (AACSB) International.

Degrees

Undergraduate majors
Accounting
Computer Information Systems
Global Logistics & International Business
Management
Marketing

Undergraduate minors
Business Administration

Graduate programs
Master of Business Administration

Footnotes

College of Business Administration